The current population of Nepal is 29,192,480 as per the 2021 census. The population growth rate is 0.93% per year.

In the 2011 census, Nepal's population was approximately 26 million people with a population growth rate of 1.35% and a median age of 21.6 years. 

In 2016, the female median age was approximately 25 years old and the male median age was approximately 22 years old. Only 4.4% of the population is estimated to be more than 65 years old, comprising 681,252 females and 597,628 males. 61% of the population is between 15 and 64 years old, and 34.6% is younger than 14 years.

In 2011, the birth rate is estimated to be 22.17 births per 1,000 people with an infant mortality rate of 46 deaths per 1,000 live births. Compared to the infant mortality rate in 2006 of 48 deaths per 1000 live births, the 2011 IMR is a slight decrease within that 5-year period. Infant mortality rate in Nepal is higher in rural regions at 44 deaths per 1000 live births, whereas in urban regions the IMR is lower at 40 deaths per 1000 live births. This difference is due to a lack of delivery assistance services in rural communities compared to their urban counterparts who have better access to hospitals and neonatal clinics.

Life expectancy at birth is estimated to be 67.44 years for females and 64.94 years for males. The mortality rate is estimated to be 681 deaths per 100,000 people.

Net migration rate is estimated to be 61 migrants per 100,000 people.

According to the 2011 census, 65.9% of the total population is literate.

Population growth 

The population of Nepal has been steadily rising in recent decades. In the June 2001 census, there was a population of about 23 million in Nepal. The population increased by 5 million from the preceding 1991 census; the growth rate is 2.3%. The current population is roughly 30 million which contributes to an increase of about 3 million people every 5 years.

Sixty caste and linguistic subgroups have formed throughout time with the waves of migration from Tibet and India. There was a moderate amount of immigration early in Nepal's history, then the population essentially remained the same without any significant fluctuations for over one hundred years. Natural disasters and the following government resettlement programs in the 1950s led to a spike in internal migration from the hills to the Terai region. In the 1980s the Western Chitwan Valley became a major transportation hub for all of Nepal. Along with this major change came a dramatic increase in government services, business expansion, and growing employment, especially in the agricultural industry. The valley's population grew rapidly through both in-migration and natural increase.

Vital statistics

UN estimates 

Source: UN DESA, World Population Prospects, 2022

Structure of the population

Life expectancy 

Source: UN World Population Prospects

Demographic statistics

Nepal Demographic and Health Survey 

Total fertility rate (TFR) (wanted fertility rate) and crude birth rate (CBR):

The following demographic statistics are from the 2011 Nepal Demographic and Health Survey (NDHS).

Median birth intervals (median number of months since preceding birth)
Total: 36.2
Rural: 35.9
Urban: 40.3 (2011)

Median age at first birth
Median age: 20.1 (2011)

Fertility rate – past trend and present
Total fertility rate: 4.6 children born/woman (1996)
Total fertility rate: 4.1 children born/woman (2001)
Total fertility rate: 3.1 children born/woman (2006)

Total fertility rate: 2.6 children born/woman
Rural fertility rate: 2.8 children born/woman
Urban fertility rate: 1.6 children born/woman (2011)

Ideal family size – mean ideal number of children
Overall (female/male): 2.1 / 2.3
Currently married (female/male): 2.2 / 2.3
Urban (female/male): 1.9 / 2.0
Rural (female/male): 2.2 / 2.3 (2011)

Ideal family size by gender and age group
Below is a table of the ideal family size by gender and age for 2011.

CIA World Factbook 
The following demographic statistics are from the CIA World Factbook, unless otherwise indicated.

Nationality
Noun: Nepali, Nepalese
Adjective: Nepali, Nepalese

Religions
Hindu 81.34%, Buddhist 9.04%,  Muslim 4.38%, Kirant 3.04%, other 2.2% (2011 census).
Literacy
Definition: age 15 and over can read and write
Total population: 67.9%
Male: 78.6%
Female: 59.7% (2018)

Population
29,033,914 (July 2016 est.)

Age structure
0–14 years: 30.93% (male 4,646,048/female 4,333,105)
15–24 years: 21.86% (male 3,176,158/female 3,169,721)
25–54 years: 35.99% (male 4,707,264/female 5,740,985)
55–64 years: 6.22% (male 877,288/female 927,202)
65 years and over: 5.02% (male 723,523/female 732,620) (2016 est.)

Median age
total: 23.6 years
male: 22.4 years
female: 24.8 years (2016 est.)

Population growth rate
1.24% (2016 est.)

Birth rate
19.9 births/1,000 population (2016 est.)

Death rate
5.7 deaths/1,000 population (2016 est.)

Net migration rate
1.9 migrants/1,000 population (2016 est.)

Total fertility rate
2.18 children born/woman (2016 est.)

Urbanization
urban population: 18.6% of total population (2015)
rate of urbanization: 3.18% annual rate of change (2010–15 est.)

Sex ratio
at birth: 1.04 males/female
0–14 years: 1.07 males/female
15–24 years: 1 males/female
25–54 years: 0.82 males/female
55–64 years: 0.95 males/female
65 years and over: 0.86 males/female
total population: 0.99 males/female (2016 est.)

Languages 

Nepal's diverse linguistic heritage evolved from three major language groups: Indo-Aryan, Tibeto-Burman languages, and various indigenous language isolates. According to the 2001 national census, 92 different living languages are spoken in Nepal (a 93rd category was "unspecified"). Based upon the 2011 census, the major languages spoken in Nepal (percentage spoken out of the mother tongue language) includes

Nepali (derived from Khas bhasa) is an Indo-Aryan language and is written in Devanagari script. Nepali was the language of the house of Gorkhas in the late 18th century and became the official, national language that serves as the lingua franca among Nepalese of different ethnolinguistic groups. Maithili, Bhojpuri, Bajjika and Awadhi languages are spoken in the southern Terai. There has been a surge in the number and percentage of people who understand English. Majority of the urban and a significant number of the rural schools are English-medium schools. Higher education in technical, medical, scientific and engineering fields are entirely in English. Nepal Bhasa, the mother-tongue of the Newars, is widely used and spoken in and around Kathmandu Valley and in major Newar trade towns across Nepal.

Other languages, particularly in the Inner Terai hill and mountain regions, are remnants of the country's pre-unification history of dozens of political entities isolated by mountains and gorges. These languages typically are limited to an area spanning about one day's walk. Beyond that distance, dialects and languages lose mutual intelligibility. However, there are some major languages spoken by indigenous peoples in the region: Magar and Gurung in the west-central hills, Tamang in the east-centre and Limbu in the east. In the high Himalayas are spoken various Tibetan languages, including Bhotia.

Since Nepal's unification, various indigenous languages have come under threat of extinction as the government of Nepal has marginalized their use through strict policies designed to promote Nepali as the official language. Indigenous languages which have gone extinct or are critically threatened include Byangsi, Chonkha, and Longaba. Since democracy was restored in 1990, however, the government has worked to improve the marginalization of these languages. Tribhuvan University began surveying and recording threatened languages in 2010 and the government intends to use this information to include more languages on the next Nepalese census.

Religion

As of the 2011 census, 81.3% of the Nepalese population was Hindu, 9.0% Buddhist, 4.4% Muslim, 3.0% Kiratist/Yumaist, 1.42% Christian, and 0.9% followed other or no religion.

Nepal defines itself as a secular nation according to Constitution of Nepal It is common for many Hindus in the country to also worship Buddhist deities simultaneously with Hindu traditions. The notion of religion in Nepal is more fluid than other countries, particularly Western countries. The Nepali people build their social networks through their religious celebrations, which are a central part to the whole of communities within the country.

There is a general idea held by the Nepalese people that there is an omnipotent, transcendental "moral order" that is sacred to Hinduism. This idea exists along with the constant presence of chaos and disorder in the material world. In the northwestern region of the country, this all-encompassing state of disorder in the world is synonymous with human affliction, which the religious shamans are believed to alleviate.

Kathmandu Valley is home to the Newars, a major ethnic group in Nepal. The city Bhaktapur is located inside of Kathmandu Valley. Bhaktapur was once an independent Hindu Kingdom. Individual homes typically have at least one shrine devoted to personal deities, with an altar displaying flowers, fruit, and oil among other offerings to the Gods. The perimeter of Kathmandu Valley is lined with shrines devoted to Hindu goddesses, whose purpose is to protect the city from chaotic events. At least one shrine can be found on the vast majority of streets in Kathmandu. The people of Nepal do not feel the need to segregate or compete based upon religion, so Hindu and Buddhist shrines are often coexisting in the same areas. The areas outside of the city are perceived to always possess some form of wild or disordered nature, so the Nepalese people inside of the city lines regularly worship the Hindu gods through public ceremonies.

The Hindu god Vishnu is believed to symbolise moral order in the Newar society. The natural human shortcomings in maintaining this moral order is believed to be represented by the Hindu god Shiva. The destruction of Shiva is neutralised by the preserver Vishnu, who tips the scales to restore order. In recent times, there has been a rise in political violence, specifically Maoist violence. This increased violence, along with the widespread poverty, has caused the Nepalese to seek stability and peace in religion.

Nepal's constitution continues long-standing legal provisions prohibiting discrimination against other religions (but also proselytization). The king was deified as the earthly manifestation of the Hindu god Vishnu. On May 19, 2006, the government faced a constitutional crisis, the House of Representatives which had been just reformed, having been previously dissolved, declared Nepal a "secular state". However, the 2001 census identified 80.6% of the population as Hindu and 10.7% as Buddhist (although many people labeled Hindu or Buddhist often practice a syncretic blend of Hinduism, Buddhism, or animist traditions), 4.2% of the population was Muslim, 3.6% of the population followed the indigenous Kirat Mundhum religion and Christianity was practiced by 0.45% of the population.

Buddhist and Hindu shrines and festivals are respected and celebrated by most Nepalese. Certain animist practises of old indigenous religions continue to survive to the modern era.

Ethnic and regional equity 

Nepali was the national language and Sanskrit became a required school subject. Children who spoke Nepali natively and who were exposed to Sanskrit had much better chances of passing the national examinations at the end of high school, which meant they had better employment prospects and could continue into higher education. Children who natively spoke local languages of the Madhesh and Hills, or Tibetan dialects prevailing in the high mountains were at a considerable disadvantage. This history of exclusion coupled with poor prospects for improvement created grievances that encouraged many in ethnic communities such as Madhesi and Tharu in the Tharuhat and Madhesh and Kham Magar in the mid-western hills to support the Unified Communist Party of Nepal (Maoist) and various other armed Maoist opposition groups such as the JTMM during and after the Nepalese Civil War. The negotiated end to this war forced King Gyanendra to abdicate in 2008. Issues of ethnic and regional equity have tended to dominate the agenda of the new republican government and continue to be divisive. Today, even after the end of a 10-year-old Maoist conflict, the upper caste dominates every field in Nepal. Although Newars are low in numbers, their urban living habitat gives them a competitive advantage. Kayastha of Madhesh are the toppers in Human Development Index. From a gender perspective, Newari women are the most literate and lead in every sector. Brahmin and Chhetri women have experienced less social and economic mobility compared to Newari women. Specifically, Brahmin women experience less equality due to their predominately rural living conditions which deprives them of access to certain educational and healthcare advantages.

Nepalese diaspora

Nepalese in the U.K. 

In the 2001 census, approximately 6,000 Nepalese were living in the UK. According to latest figure from Office for National Statistics estimates that 51,000 Nepal-born people are currently resident in the UK. There has been increasing interest in the opportunities offered in the UK by the Nepalese, especially education. Between the years of 2001 to 2006, there were 7,500 applications for student visas.

Nepalese in Hong Kong 

The Nepali people residing in Hong Kong are primarily made up of children of ex-Gurkhas; born in Hong Kong during their parents' service with the British Army's Brigade of Gurkhas, which was based in Hong Kong from the 1970s until the handover. Large groups of Nepali people can be found in Shek Kong and Yuen Long District off of the main bases of the British army. Many ex-Gurkhas remained in Hong Kong after the end of their service under the sponsorship of their Hong Kong-born children, who held right of abode.

Nepalese of middle age or older generations in Hong Kong are predominantly found in security, while those of younger generations are predominantly found in the business industry.

Mostly the people from Kirati ethnic groups such as Rai and Limbu are the ones residing in Hong Kong and other neighbouring nations such as Singapore and Japan.

Nepalese overseas 
Nepali migrants abroad have suffered tremendous hardships, including some 7,500 deaths in the Middle East and Malaysia alone since the year 2000, some 3,500 in Saudi Arabia.

Foreign population in Nepal 
According to the 2001 census, there were 116,571 foreign born citizens in Nepal; 90% of them were of Indian origin (Biharis) followed by Bhutan, Pakistan and China. This number does not include the refugees from Bhutan and Tibet.

See also
Ethnic groups in Nepal

References

External links 
 Nepal Encyclopedia Ethnicity Page
 Population of Nepal 2078
 CIA Fact Book, 2016
 Nepal information Site
 Current Situation of Population In Nepal Census 2068
 People of Nepal 

 
Gurkhas